Meshk-e Anbar (also Romanized as Meshk-e ‘Anbar, Meshk‘anbar, and Moshk ‘Anbar; also known as Meshg ‘Anbar, Meshg ‘Anbar Mīāneh, Moshg Anbar, and Mushkyambar) is a village in Sina Rural District, in the Central District of Varzaqan County, East Azerbaijan Province, Iran. At the 2006 census, its population was 245, in 50 families.

References 

Towns and villages in Varzaqan County